On 15 October 2018, the Russian Orthodox Church broke the communion with the Ecumenical Patriarchate because of a dispute concerning the canonical jurisdiction over Ukraine. This led to the 2018 Moscow–Constantinople schism. Numerous Orthodox churches took position concerning the dispute over the canonical jurisdiction over Ukraine, whether before or after this schism.

Russian Orthodox Church and the Ecumenical Patriarchate

Russian Orthodox Church

2018

September 
On 1 September, Metropolitan Hilarion, head of the Department for External Church Relations (DECR) of the ROC, declared: "we very much hope that the Patriarchate of Constantinople will manifest responsibility and take into consideration all the voices of Local Orthodox Churches, which have been clearly sounded in this period, and that the unity of world Orthodoxy will be preserved."

On 8 September 2018, an interview by Metropolitan Hilarion, chairman of the Department of External Church Relations of the Russian Orthodox Church, was published on the official website of the External Church Relations of the Russian Orthodox Church. In it, Hilarion warned:
On 8 September, the synod of the Russian Orthodox Church expressed its "resolute protest against and deep indignation at" the report published a day prior on the appointment of the two hierarchs of the Ecumenical Patriarchate as exarchs of the Patriarchate for Kiev. The same day, on a social network, Vladimir Legoyda, head of the Synodal Department for Church, Society and Media Relations of the Russian Orthodox Church, commented on the topic and stated that "[t]he appointment by the Patriarch of Constantinople of his episcopal representatives in Ukraine, without agreement with the Patriarch of Moscow [...] and His Beatitude [the] Metropolitan of Kiev [...], is [...] an unprecedentedly gross incursion into the Moscow Patriarchate's canonical territory[.] [...] These actions cannot be left unanswered". The same day, the UOC-MP published an official declaration on its website which states: "[T]he appointment of the two Exarchs is a gross violation of the canonical territory of the Ukrainian Orthodox Church. The decision made by the Constantinopolitan Patriarchate contradicts the 2nd Canon of the Second Ecumenical Council (Constantinople), namely that, without being invited, "Bishops must not leave their own diocese and go over to churches beyond its boundaries"."

On 14 September 2018, in response to the appointment of those two exarchs, the Russian Orthodox Church decided to hold "an extraordinary session" to take "retaliatory measures after the appointment by the Patriarchate of Constantinople of its "exarchs" to Kiev following up the decision of this Church's Synod "to grant autocephalous status to the Orthodox Church in Ukraine."" The synod of the ROC decided to stop commemorating the Ecumenical Patriarch during the divine liturgy.

On 30 September 2018, in an interview to Izvestia daily published on the official website of the Moscow Patriarchate's Department for External Church Relations, Metropolitan Hilarion commented: "The Russian Church does not need to fear isolation. If Constantinople continues its anti-canonical actions, it will place itself outside the canonical space, outside the understanding of church order that distinguishes the Orthodox Church."

October 
On 2 October, Patriarch Kirill of the ROC sent a letter to all the autocephalous Orthodox churches to ask them to hold a "Pan-Orthodox discussion" concerning the question of Ukraine's autocephaly.

On 5 October, the Metropolitan Pavel, head of the Belarusian Orthodox Church (exarchate of the Russian Orthodox Church), announced the meeting of the Holy Synod of the Russian Orthodox Church on 15 October in Minsk. He said that "The situation with the Orthodox Church in Ukraine will be on the agenda of the meeting". This meeting had been announced previously on 7 January 2018 and was at the time "most likely to take place in mid October."

On 9 October, Metropolitan Hilarion, chairman of the Department of External Church Relations of the Russian Orthodox Church warned that "if the project for Ukrainian autocephaly is carried through, it will mean a tragic and possibly irretrievable schism of the whole Orthodoxy." He added that "ignoring sacred canons shakes up the whole system of the church organism. Schismatics in other Local Churches are well aware that if autocephaly is given to the Ukrainian schismatics, it will be possible to repeat the same scenario anywhere. That is why we state that autocephaly in Ukraine will not be ‘the healing of the schism’ but its legalization and encouragement."
On 16 October 2018, the very next day after the break of communion, Metropolitan Hilarion, chairman of the Department of External Church Relations of the Russian Orthodox Church, explained on Russian television that the decisions of the Patriarch of Constantinople "run contrary to the canonical Tradition of the Orthodox Church". Moreover, an official communicate from the External Church Relations of the Russian Orthodox Church published the same day quoted Hilarion saying: "we no longer have a single coordinating center in the Orthodox Church, and we should very clearly realize that the Patriarchate of Constantinople has self-destructed as such [because] having invaded the canonical boundaries of another Local Church, by legitimatizing a schism it [the Ecumenical Patriarchate] has lost the right to be called the coordinating center for the Orthodox Church"

On 17 October, Metropolitan Hilarion, head of the Moscow Patriarchate Department for External Church Relations, was interviewed by the BBC Russian Service; this interview was published on the official website of the Department of External Church Relations of the Russian Orthodox Church the very same day. Hilarion declared: "As of today, we have very clearly stated: the fact that the Patriarchate of Constantinople has recognized a schismatic structure means for us that Constantinople itself is now in schism. It has identified itself with a schism. Accordingly, we cannot have the full Eucharistic communion with it." Hilarion added that when members of the Russian Orthodox of Moscow Patriarchate pay visits to the monasteries on Mount Athos, they cannot participate in the sacraments (for example, receive communion), and promised punishment to any priests who participate in the divine services together with the local clergy. It is known that Russia makes large donations to the monasteries on Athos (the sum of $200 million was announced by a source close to the Moscow Patriarchate and confirmed by Hilarion). Hilarion hinted that "[h]istory shows that when Athos is concerned over something, the monasteries on the Holy Mountain do find ways to inform the Patriarch of Constantinople about it" and called on Russian businessmen to switch donations to Russian sacred places.

On 19 October, during a meeting with Pope Francis, Hilarion announces him that "because of the actions of the Patriarchate of Constantinople the Russian Orthodox Church had to suspend its participation in the work of the Joint International Commission for Theological Dialogue between the Roman Catholic Church and the Orthodox Church". Hilarion explained on November that it was due to the fact that the synod of the Russian Orthodox Church had previously, on 14 September, decided "to break off the participation of the Russian Orthodox Church in the Episcopal Assemblies and in the theological dialogues, multilateral commissions and any other structures chaired or co-chaired by representatives of the Patriarchate of Constantinople."

On 21 October, Metropolitan Hilarion declared in an interview that "[t]he Patriarch of Constantinople, who has positioned himself as the coordinator of common Orthodox activity, can no longer be such a coordinator" because said Patriarch of Constantinople had "opted for schismatics and ha[d] fully associated himself with them"; this interview was published on the official website of the Department of External Church Relations of the Russian Orthodox Church.

On 22 October, Hilarion published a declaration on the same official website which stipulates that according to the Russian Orthodox Church, Filaret "was and remains a schismatic" despite the recognition of Filaret by the Patriarch of Constantinople. In the declaration, Hilarion also expressed his fears that, since on the 20 October 2018 the UOC-KP had decided to give the title of archimandrite of the Kiev Pechersk and Pochayiv Lavras to Filaret, Filaret could be planning to seize "the main holy sites of the canonical Ukrainian Church [i.e. the Ukrainian Orthodox Church (Moscow Patriarchate)]". On 30 October Filaret declared that after the unification council there would be no violence against the UOC, including in resolving property issues.

On 23 October, Archpriest Igor Yakimchuk, from the Moscow Patriarchate Department for External Church Relations secretary for far abroad, told Interfax that "[g]iven that the Byzantine Empire long ago ceased to exist and that Istanbul is not even the capital of Turkey now, there are no more canonical foundations even for the symbolic primacy of the Constantinople Patriarchate in the Orthodox world", and that the ROC would not comply to the Ecumenical Patriarch's decision.

On 27 October, archpriest Nikolai Balashov, Deputy Head of Department for External Church Relations (DECR) of the ROC, declared in an interview that they "will never stop regarding Kiev as the mother of all Russian cities, as the font of [their] christening, birthplace of [their] Christian culture." The same day, on the Russia-24 channel, Metropolitan Hilarion gave an interview; the restranscription of this interview was published the 28 October on the official website of the Department of External Church Relations of the Russian Orthodox Church. Hilarion declared that the Ecumenical Patriarch was "in a great hurry" to satisfies his "customers" from Ukraine and the USA, he also claimed that a special division of the staff in the US embassies was dedicated to influence the Ecumenical Patriarch and to take care of the situation in Ukraine. He also stated: "We understand that Patriarch Bartholomew is not free now in his actions."

On 28 October, the Patriarch of Moscow Kirill stated in a speech, which was two days later published on the official website of the Department of External Church Relations of the Russian Orthodox Church, that there was "no conflict whatsoever between Constantinople and Moscow! There is Moscow's defense of the inviolable canonical norms [...] If one of the Churches supports the schismatics, if one of the Churches violates canons, then she ceases to be an Orthodox Church. Therefore, the position of the Russian Orthodox Church today, which has stopped the liturgical mention of the Patriarch of Constantinople, has to do not only with the relationships between the two Patriarchs – the point is the very nature of the Orthodox Churc[h]."

November 

In an interview given to Orthodoxia.info published on 6 November 2018, Metropolitan Onufriy's spokesman, Archbishop Kliment (Vecheria), declared that the Ecumenical Patriarch should have remembered that "Byzantium ended 500 years ago" and added that the Church "lives according to the gospel and not based on 'prerogatives' rooted in a nonexistent empire".

On 12 November the first priest was sent by Patriarch Kirill to Istanbul (Turkey) "at the request of Russian believers who live in Turkey".

In November, the Moscow Patriarchate established a parish in Constantinople, a territory under the canonical jurisdiction of the Ecumenical Patriarchate.

During the month of November, Metropolitan Hilarion gave some interviews to news agencies from different countries which were published on the official website of the Department of External Church Relations of the Russian Orthodox Church. He declared that "the mechanisms of inter-Orthodox dialogue and cooperation, which were developing for a long while, have been destroyed. [...] [T]he Patriarchate of Constantinople, first in honour, acted as coordinator of the inter-Orthodox activities. Yet, now, when over a half of all the Orthodox Christians in the world are not in communion with it, Constantinople has lost this role". In another interview he said that the Ecumenical Patriarch "claims the power over history itself by revoking decisions made over three centuries ago", that "[t]he danger of destruction of ages-old traditions has been more and more clearly realized now by Primates and hierarchs of Local Orthodox Churches, who speak out in favour of a pan-Orthodox discussion on the Ukrainian problem. In the new situation, which has shaped now, we have to search for new forms of communication of Churches adequate to it", and that the Ecumenical Patriarch could not chair a Pan-Orthodox Council since "[t]he coordinating role that the Throne of Constantinople played, though not without difficulties, in the Orthodox world in the second part of the 20th century, cannot be played by it now" because "[t]he Patriarchate of Constantinople has self-destructed as the coordinating center for Orthodox Churches." In his last interview he declared that the Ecumenical Patriarch's actions "allegedly aimed to heal the Ukrainian schism [...] [a]ctually lead to the deepening of the schism in Ukraine and to creating for the Orthodox Church an unprecedented situation when the whole body of the world Orthodoxy may find itself split into pieces."

On 22 November, Metropolitan Hilarion said on the channel Russia-TV 24 that Ukraine would never get its autocephaly.

On 26 November, Metropolitan Hilarion declared that the ROC would send a priest in South Korea and declared the plans "to create a full-fledged parish", because until the 1950s in Korea was a Russian Spiritual Mission whose faithfuls were in the 1950s transferred to the Ecumenical Patriarchate's jurisdiction. The priest is scheduled to be sent by the end of the year.

On 28 November, the ROC officials reacted at the announce of the Ecumenical Patriarchate's decision (taken on 27 November 2018) to dissolve the Archdiocese of Russian Orthodox Churches in Western Europe. The ROC officials reminded that during the spring of 2003, Patriarch Alexy II of Moscow proposed to all bishops and Orthodox parishes of Russian tradition in Western Europe to unite as part of the self-governing metropolitan district of the Russian Orthodox Church.

December 

On 4 December, in an interview given to Orthodoxie.com, Metropolitan Hilarion declared that the fact the Patriarch of Constantinople had fallen in schism "was not without precedents in the history of the Constantinople Patriarchate" and gave the example of Nestorius and the Patriarchs of Constantinople who accepted the union with the Catholic Church after the Council of Florence. He also said the Ecumenical Patriarchate's actions in Ukraine were a "revenge" on Patriarch Kirill of Moscow because, according to Hilarion, the Ecumenical Patriarch believes that it is the Russian Orthodox Church who incited some Orthodox churches not to participate in the Pan-Orthodox Council of Crete.

On 14 December, ROC claimed that Patriarch Kirill sent messages to the Primates of the Local Orthodox Churches, to Pope Francis, to Archbishop of Canterbury Justin Welby, head of the Anglican Communion, to Rev. Dr. Olav Fykse Tveit, General Secretary of the World Council of Churches, to António Guterres, United Nations Secretary-General, and to Thomas Greminger, Secretary General of the Organization for Security and Co-operation in Europe. He also sent messages to Emmanuel Macron, President of France, and to Angela Merkel, Chancellor of Germany, as they were both heads of the Normandy format. Patriarch Kirill wanted to draw their attention to what he perceived as "the large-scale violations of the rights and freedom of hierarchs, clergy and laity of the Ukrainian Orthodox Church." However, UN Secretary-General António Guterres did not receive such a letter.

On 15 December, after the election of Epiphany at the unification council, archpriest Nikolay Balashov, deputy head of the Moscow Patriarchate Department for External Church Relations, told Interfax that this election "means nothing" for the ROC.

After the unification council, the Patriarch of Moscow sent a letter to the primates of all the autocephalous local Orthodox churches (but not to the Ecumenical Patriarchate nor to the OCU), urging them not to recognize the OCU and that "there was no unification. The schismatics were and still are outside the Church."

On 21 December, after the diocesan assembly of Moscow, the Patriarch of Moscow declared during that the Soviet persecution of the ROC, the Patriarchate of Constantinople "did all it could to tear from [the ROC's] living body those parts that were within its reach: Estonia, Finland, Poland, and Latvia."

On 28 December, the synod of the ROC decided to establish an exarchate of Western Europe of the Moscow Patriarchate. It was decided that the following countries would be under the exarchate's responsibility: Andorra, Belgium, the United Kingdom, Ireland, Spain, Italia, Liechtenstein, Luxembourg, the Principality of Monaco, the Netherlands, Portugal, France, and Switzerland. This was done in response to the Ecumenical Patriarchate's actions in Ukraine. On the same day, in an interview with Russia-24 channel, Metropolitan Hilarion declared the ROC "will now act as if they [Constantinople] do not exist at all because our purpose is missionary, our task is to educate, we are creating these structures for ministerial care about our flock, there can be no such deterring factors here", and that the ROC will take charge of the Orthodox faithfuls of its diaspora instead of the Eumenical Patriarchate.

On 29 December, during an interview to the channel Russia-24, Metropolitan Hilarion declared the Patriarch of Moscow had informed during the last meeting of the Supreme Diocesan Assembly of Moscow Orthodox faithfuls could communiate in the territory of the Mount Athos, but only in the Saint Panteleimon Monastery. The territory of the Mount Athos is under the jurisdiction of the Ecumenical Patriarchate. Hilarion declared the Saint Panteleimon Monastery "belongs to the Constantinople Church, as do all monasteries on Mt. Athos, but we know that it was built with Russian money by Russian monks and houses a Russian and Ukrainian monastic brotherhood, all rites are performed in a Slavic language and the laity who come there may take communion in it ... But not in other Athos monasteries".

On 30 December, Interfax reported that the ROC was building a church on the territory of the embassy of Russia  in Ankara. Turkey is part of the jurisdiction of the Ecumenical Patriarchate.

On 30 December, Patriarch Kirill sent a letter to Ecumenical Patriarch Bartholomew. In this letter, Kirill declared: "if you [Ecumenical Patriarch] will act in keeping with intentions enunciated in your letter, you will forever lose an opportunity to serve to the unity of the holy Churches of God, will cease being the First in the Orthodox world which numbers hundreds of millions of believers, and the sufferings that you have inflicted upon Orthodox Ukrainians will follow you to the Last Judgment of our Lord who judges all people impartially and will testify against you before Him." The letter was published on the official websites of the ROC on 31 December.

2019

January 

On 5 January, press secretary of the Patriarch of Moscow Alexander Volkov declared that "Patriarch Bartholomew today finally cut himself off from world Orthodoxy by joining the schism" because the Ecumenical Patriarch had signed the tomos granting autocephaly to the OCU. On the same day, Vladimir Legoyda, head of the Synodal Department for Church, Society and Media Relations of the ROC declared the tomos of autocephaly the Ecumenical Patriarch had signed was "a paper that is a result of unbridled political and personal ambitions. Signed in violation of the canons and thus possessing no canonical force".

On 7 January 2019, during the festive Christmas liturgy in the Cathedral of Christ the Savior, Patriarch Kirill of the ROC did not mention a single name of the primates of other local Orthodox Churches, with whom the ROC is in canonical communion. Such commemoration (in Greek, it is called "diptych") is demanded by a church charter and is a centuries-old tradition. In contrast to this, the head of the newly created Orthodox Church of Ukraine, Metropolitan Epiphanius, solemnly listed the names of all the primates, including the "Most Holy Patriarch of Russia Kirill".

On 14 January 2019, Metropolitan Hilarion declared:

On 30 January 2019, Vladimir Legoyda, head of the Russian Orthodox Church's Department for Church, Society and Media Relations, wrote that the tomos of the OCU made the OCU a vassal of the Ecumenical Patriarchate.

On 31 January, Patriarch Kirill declared the point of no return between the ROC and the Ecumenical Patriarchate had not been reached, stating: "The point of no return is the end of existence. Each of us will experience such a point when our physical life ends. But as long as we live, as long as the Church lives, no point of no return must exist, and I am sure this will not happen". On the same day, he declared:

On 11 February 2019, Metropolitan Hilarion said in an interview published on the official website of the DECR that the Mount Athos had to make a choice and that he hopes the Mount Athos "will make the only right choice – the one in favor of canonical order."

April 
In April, an article of Metropolitan Hilarion was published on the website of the DECR, titled "Two-headed hydra of Ukrainian schism and the world Orthodoxy" In the article, Hilarion which he explained why, according to him, no other local Orthodox Churches apart from the Ecumenical Patriarchate have recognized the OCU in the last four months.

May 
On 29 May, the Moscow Patriarchate Department For External Church Relations published a commentary of the 20 February 2019 letter of the Ecumenical Patriarchate to Archbishop Anastasios of Albania; the comment had been written by experts of the Synodal Biblical and Theological Commission of the ROC.

On 30 May 2019, Vladimir Legoyda, head of the Synodal Department for Church, Society and Media Relations of the ROC, said the ROC was aware of the efforts of the Church of Cyprus primate, Chrysostomos II, and added that "to some extent [Chrysostomos'] actions can be considered in line with the ROC proposal (...) He has consistently held talks with representatives from various local Churches, telling of the need to resolve the problem" Legoyda also said the ROC "has repeatedly stressed the desire and the need for a pan-Orthodox decision on this issue because it cannot be resolved unilaterally"

October 
On 7 October 2019, the ROC officially released a comments by the Secretariat of the Biblical and Theological Synodal Commission of the Russian Orthodox Church. "The document discusses the problems of apostolic succession among schismatic «hierarchs», the limits of application of the oikonomia principle, issues of the lack of legitimacy of the OCU, the distortion of the role of the first bishop in the Orthodox Church, and explains the suspension of Eucharistic communion."

On 17 October 2019, the Holy Synod of the ROC reacted to the announcement that the Church of Greece had recognized the OCU. The Holy Synod stated: "If the Ukrainian schism is really recognized by the Greek Orthodox Church and its Primate — either in the form of a joint service, liturgical commemoration of the leader of the schism or sending official letters to them — it will be a sad testimony to the deepening division in the family of local Orthodox Churches. [...] We cease the prayer and Eucharistic communion with those bishops of the Greek Church who have entered or will enter into communion with representatives of the Ukrainian non-canonical schismatic communities. [...] the Holy Synod of the Russian Orthodox Church authorizes his Holiness Patriarch Kirill of Moscow and all Russia to stop the commemoration of the name of His Beatitude Archbishop of Athens and the entire Greece in the diptychs if the Primate of the Greek Church begins to commemorate the head of one of the Ukrainian schismatic groups during divine services or takes other actions indicating the recognition of the Ukrainian schism."

Ecumenical Patriarchate

2018 
On 22 October, the Ecumenical Patriarch Bartholomew declared "Whether our Russian brothers like it or not, soon enough they will get behind the Ecumenical Patriarchate's solution, as they will have no other choice". The Ecumenical Patriarch added he was aware Russia was doing efforts to thwart the Ecumenical Patriarchate's plans.

On 23 September 2018 Patriarch Bartholomew, while celebrating Divine Liturgy in the Saint Fokas Orthodox Church "proclaimed that he had sent a message that Ukraine would receive autocephaly as soon as possible, since it is entitled to it".

On 26 September, the recently appointed exarch of Ukraine, declared on his Facebook page that concerning the future of Ukraine "[t]he path to the Autocephaly is irreversible".

On 24 November, the Ecumenical Patriarch declared to the holy synod of the Romanian Orthodox Church concerning the pre-conciliar agreement concerning the granting of autocephaly to a church:

On 13 December 2018, in his homily, Ecumenical Patriarch Bartholomew declared the decision by the ROC to break communion was "extreme", and "unacceptable" as a lever of pressure.

On 14 December, the Ecumenical Patriarchate published on its official website a comment by Metropolitan Sotirios of Pisidia regarding the celebration of a mass at Belek by a priest of the ROC with the support of the Russian consulate in Antalya. In said commentary, the Metropolitan said this region was part of the Ecumenical Patriarchate's jurisdiction and that the priest of the ROC had not asked the Ecumenical Patriarchate to conduct this mass on the Ecumenical Patriarchate's territory. Therefore, according to the Metropolitan, the priest had transgressed some canons, and such a behavior could create a schism among the faithfuls of the region of Belek.

On 24 December 2018, Patriarch Bartholomew responded to the allegations made by the ROC that he had been bribed. Bartholomew responded by making a joke saying "the Russian Church accuses me of having received money to proclaim this autocephaly – actually I didn't really receive money, but rather a lot of candies and chocolates from the factory… the factory of Poroshenko. He sent me a lot of sacks like these, I have already distributed them all. These two are the last ones. I will open them, and throw them among you, so whoever is lucky will get some of it." (for the reference of the joke, see: Petro Poroshenko#Business career). The video of this speech was published on the official Facebook page of the Ecumenical Patriarchate.

2019 
On 25 January 2019, the Ecumenical Patriarch talked about the subject of the Orthodox Church of Ukraine.

In 2019, the Ecumenical Patriarch declared, in a letter to Patriarch John X of Antioch, that he (the Ecumenical Patriarch) would not convene a pan-Orthodox council on the question of Ukraine.

On 20 February 2019, the Ecumenical Patriarch answered the letter of the Holy Synod of the Albanian Orthodox Church. The Ecumenical Patriarch justified, with historical arguments, that the Ecumenical Patriarchate had the right to give autocephaly to the OCU. Concerning the validity of the ordinations performed by Filaret, the Ecumenical Patriarch joined the researches of Metropolitan Vasily and cited the example of the mending of the Meletian schism, the Bulgarian schism, and the ROCOR schism to prove the validity of Filaret's ordinations.

In an interview published on 21 February 2019 in the Serbian magazine Politika, the Ecumenical Patriarch Bartholomew declared that there is no Pope of the East in the religious conscience of Orthodox Church. In the same interview, he declared: "As for the provision of autocephaly with the consent of other Orthodox Churches, this did not happen, because it is not a tradition in our Church. All the Tomoses of the autocephaly that were granted to the newly created autocephalous churches (Russia, Serbia, Romania, Bulgaria, Georgia, Athens, Warsaw, Tirana and Presov) were provided by the Ecumenical Patriarchate, and this was not preceded by any agreement or negotiation at the Pan-Orthodox level." Bartholomew also declared that no State pressured the Ecumenical Patriarchate to grant autocephaly to Ukraine, but that "a large number of state leaders have greeted the Ecumenical Patriarchate with this decision."

In May 2019, Ecumenical Patriarch Bartholomew declared in a speech to journalists: "Regarding this issue and the Patriarchate's stance, a lot of false information have been fed to the media, such as falsified historical facts and distorted truth while the true facts have been carefully or/and deliberately concealed."

On 23 May, the Archons of the Ecumenical Patriarch announced an E-book titled The Ecumenical Patriarchate and Ukraine Autocephaly: Historical, Canonical, and Pastoral Perspectives would be released soon "to inform all people of goodwill about the truth regarding the Autocephaly granted by the Ecumenical Patriarchate of Constantinople to the Orthodox Church in Ukraine". On 30 May 2019, the E-book version of the book was released.

Responses from other autocephalous Eastern Orthodox churches

Church of Cyprus 
On 26 September 2018, the head of the Church of Cyprus, Archbishop Chrysostomos II, had a meeting with the Ukrainian ambassador in Cyprus, Borys Humeniuk; during this meeting, the question of the ecclesiastical problems in Ukraine was discussed. During the meeting, Chrysostomos II "expressed his worry and concern about the latest events in the Ukrainian Church and the possibility of the creation of a schism that would harm the unity of all Orthodoxy" and declared that the Church of Cyprus was ready to be a "bridge for the normalization of the unstable situation" between the Patriarchates of Moscow and Constantinople concerning the question of the Orthodoxy in Ukraine. Those declarations were published on the official website of the Church of Cyprus.

On 9 January 2019, Archbishop Chrysostomos declared: "What's most important right now is not autocephaly, but that Orthodoxy may not be divided" He added he would never commemorate the name of the primate of the Orthodox Church of Ukraine in the dyptich of the Divine Liturgy. On 25 January 2019, Archbishop Chrysostomos declared he considered the Ecumenical Patriarchate as the "Mother Church" and that he "maintains good relations with the Phanar, which he will preserve despite any difficulties." He added he would concelebrate one day with Metropolitan Epiphanius once the latter would have come in Cyprus.

On 7 February 2019, the holy synod of the Church of Cyprus decided that on 18 February 2019 the holy synod of the Church of Cyprus will hold an extraordinary meeting to give its final decision concerning the Ukrainian question. On 18 February, the Church of Cyprus declared it did not doubt the goals of granting autocephaly in Ukraine was to heal the schism in Ukraine; the Church of Cyprus also stated that if the schism in Ukraine was not overcame in a certain amount of time, the Church of Cyprus "expect[s] that the Ecumenical Patriarch, making use of his regulatory role given to him by his position as First in Orthodoxy, will convene either a Pan-Orthodox Council or a Synaxis of the Primates to act upon the matter." In the same communiqué, the Church of Cyprus declared it offered to be a mediator on the issue. The Church of Cyprus did not state it recognized the OCU.

Meeting with representatives of other churches 
On 18 April 2019, the primates of the Church of Cyprus, the Church of Alexandria, the Church of Antioch, and the Church of Jerusalem gathered. They released a communiqué in which they write that among other things they "looked into the problems that arose after granting autocephaly to the Orthodox Church in Ukraine". The primates of Alexandria, Antioch and Jerusalem supported the "initiative of mediation" of the primate of the Church of Cyprus.

The primate of the Church of Cyprus released a communiqué on 14 May 2019 in which he said: "I have not received any order! I am leaving for Serbia, Bulgaria, and Greece to discuss the Ukrainian issue" From 17 May to 21 May he met the primates of the Bulgarian, Greek and Serbian Orthodox churches.

In May 2019, Archbishop Chrysostomos was interviewed concerning his mediation role in which he said: "if one Church agrees with one side, another Church will agree with the other, and it will be a great evil! We could then reach a schism! The best is for us all to agree, and to make a decision all together, because the decision of only one Church will not serve any purpose, and what I am afraid of would happen. For myself, I could make a decision in favor of one side or the other, but I consider it wrong. That's why I didn't do it!"

In an interview given on 6 September 2019, the primate of the Church of Cyprus said the Ecumenical Patriarch Bartholomew was displeased with the former's initiative of meetings: "We have taken the first step. We tried to begin seeing different Church primates and discovered that the Ecumenical Patriarch didn't want something like this. After that we just said, 'Did we commit a murder?' We stop here!" He also added: "As the Church of Cyprus we did not say we recognize [the Orthodox Church of Ukraine], but we do not recognize it either. We maintain a neutral relationship, and we want to have good relations with everyone."

In December 2019, the primate of the Church of Cyprus reiterated that his church had taken a neutral stance despite the actions of some of its hierarchs. He added that the Patriarchate of Moscow had asked him for his support; he replied that he disagreed with the decisions of the Moscow Patriarch to cease commemorating some other primates (the Ecumenical Patriarch, the Archbishop of Athens, and the Patriarch of Alexandria). He added: "[The Patriarch of Moscow] is going to create a schism. And the schism is the greatest sin. I do not understand it. He wants to be the first. I told him you would never be the first. Over the past 17 centuries, the Patriarch of Constantinople has been established as first among all Eastern Orthodox primates. Full stop."

Greek Orthodox Church of Alexandria 
On 22 October 2018, the Greek Orthodox Patriarchate of Alexandria and the Polish Orthodox Church issued a joint statement in which they "call upon all those on whom it depends to eliminate church misunderstandings associated with the bestowal of autocephaly to the Ukrainian Church; to please do whatever is within their might to avoid conflict over this issue in order to establish church order on Ukrainian territory."

On 18 April 2019, the primates of the Church of Cyprus, the Church of Alexandria, the Church of Antioch, and the Church of Jerusalem gathered. They released a communiqué in which they write that among other things they "looked into the problems that arose after granting autocephaly to the Orthodox Church in Ukraine". The primates of Alexandria, Antioch and Jerusalem supported the "initiative of mediation" of the primate of the Church of Cyprus.

In June 2019, the Orthodox Patriarch of Alexandria, in an interview, took a stand on the Ukrainian issue for the first time. He said the Ecumenical Patriarch "had the right to grant" autocephaly, but that the question of who received this autocephaly is what created divisions among the Orthodox churches. He added: "Every problem has its solution. Our Ecumenical Patriarch Bartholomew is the Patriarch of Romiosyne, who we all respect and love. Do not forget that this issue is not a dogmatic one. There is a solution to the issue of Autocephaly."

Polish Orthodox Church 
In May 2018, the Polish Orthodox Church (POC) declared it "express[es] a clear position of the Polish Autocephalous Church, namely, that the ecclesiastic life of the canonical Orthodox Church should be based on the principles of dogmatiс theology and the holy canons of the Orthodox Church. [...] The violation of this principle brings chaos to the life of the Church. In Ukraine, there are certain schismatic groups that must first repent and return to the canonical Church. Only then can we discuss the issue of granting autocephaly."

In September 2018, Secretary of the Chancellery of the POC sent a letter to rbc.ru in response to a request for a statement from the POC on the matter of Ukrainian autocephaly. In this letter, the POC reinstate its May 2018 position and that "[c]onsent of all the Local Churches is needed in order to grant the autocephaly to the Ukrainian Church, and a hasty decision can deepen the schism ... autocephaly is granted by the Mother Church after reaching agreement with the Primates of all the Local Churches[.]"

On 22 October 2018, the Greek Orthodox Patriarchate of Alexandria and the Polish Orthodox Church issued a joint statement in which they "call upon all those on whom it depends to eliminate church misunderstandings associated with the bestowal of autocephaly to the Ukrainian Church; to please do whatever is within their might to avoid conflict over this issue in order to establish church order on Ukrainian territory."

On 16 November 2018, the Polish Orthodox Church issued an official communiqué after the meeting of its synod on 15 November 2018. The Polish Orthodox Church declared in this communiqué that it did not recognize the rehabilitation of the UAOC and the UOC-KP and that the synod "forbids the priests of the Polish Orthodox Church from having liturgical and prayerful contact with the ‘clergy’ of the so-called Kiev Patriarchate and the so-called ‘Autocephalous Orthodox Church,’ which have committed much evil in the past". The communiqué also stated that "[o]nly the observance of the dogmatic and canonical norms of the Church and the preservation of the centuries-old tradition will protect Orthodoxy from severe ecclesiastical consequences on an international scale."

On 8 January 2019, Metropolitan Sawa, primate of the Polish Orthodox Church, declared that Epiphanius was a layperson and not member of the clergy. He added that the grant of autocephaly to the OCU was a violation of the canon law.

On 2 April 2019, the Assembly of bishops of the POC released a communiqué. In it, it declared it reiterated its stance taken 9 May and 15 November 2018. The communiqué says the POC is in favor of granting autocephaly to Ukraine, and that autocephaly should be given "according to the dogmatic and canonical norms of the whole Church, and not of a group of schismatics. Those who left the Church and have been deprived of their priestly ordination, cannot represent a healthy ecclesial body. It is an uncanonical act, violating the Eucharistic and inter-Orthodox unity." In the same communiqué, the POC declared that when it received schismatics they were reordinated, however religious experts disagreed, saying that there is no documents or pictorial proofs proving the ordinations happened, and citing the case of bishops of the Lusitanian Orthodox Church who were accepted into the POC without reordinations.

Serbian Orthodox Church 
In August 2018, Patriarch Irinej, primate of the Serbian Orthodox Church (SOC), sent a letter to the Ecumenical Patriarch concerning the situation in Ukraine. In it, Irinej characterized as "very perilous or even catastrophic, probably as fatal for the unity of Holy Orthodoxy" the act "of exonerating and of restoring schismatics to the rank of bishops, especially the arch-schismatic ones, such as ‘patriarch’ Filaret Denysenko of Kyiv, and of bringing schismatics back into liturgical and canonical communion, without their repentance and their return to the unity of the Russian Orthodox Church from which they detached themselves. And all without the consent of the Moscow Patriarchate and without coordination with him" Irinej added he was afraid the schismatics of the Montenegrin Orthodox Church would also be legitimised despite the fact that Montenegro is under the jurisdiction of the Serbian Orthodox Church.

Not so long before the schism, head of the Serbian Orthodox Church, Patriarch Irinej, considered the presumable schism between Moscow and Constantinople would be the hardest of all those that have ever been, even greater quantitatively than the schism of 1054. He stated that the Serbian Church does not accept the existence of two Orthodox Christianities  - "Fanariotic" (i.e. Constantinople's) and "Moscow's". He added his church did not stand for Moscow nor was against Constantinople, but supported the established order and opposed any decisions that would certainly lead to dire consequences. He also declared that if non-canonical churches were recognized, a similar phenomenon would happen "in Macedonia, but also in Montenegro, Abkhazia, and wherever the contracting authorities and perpetrators have imagined, even, perhaps, in Greece."

After the schism, Patriarch Irinej gave an interview in which he condemned the 11 October decision of the Ecumenical Patriarchate. In his opinion, this decision increases the risks of new divisions in the Local Churches, while the Ecumenical Patriarch had no right to recognize the schismatic church and grant it an autocephaly. Some Serbian Church officials also expressed concerns that this decision would be followed by recognition of the Macedonian Orthodox Church, which had split from the Serbian Orthodox Church in 1967 and hadn't received recognition at the time of the Moscow–Constantinople schism.

On 20 October 2018, the Serbian and Antiochian patriarchs made a common declaration in which they "appeal to their brother, His All Holiness the Ecumenical Patriarch, to restore the fraternal dialogue with the Orthodox Church of Russia in order to, with the fraternal assistance and participation of all the other primates of the Local Orthodox Autocephalous Churches, resolve the conflict between the Patriarchates of Constantinople and Moscow and to restore back the bond of peace in the Orthodox Church".

On 12 November 2018, the synod of the Serbian Orthodox Church published a communiqué in which they declared they considered the reinstatement of Filaret and Makariy as "non-binding for the Serbian Orthodox Church" and that they would therefore not communiate with them or their supporters. Synod also requested convocation of a Pan-Orthodox Synod over the issue.

The patriarch of the Serbian Orthodox Church wrote on his christmas encyclical: "If, in accordance with the logic of this world, autocephaly is understood in any other way, as an element of a state's sovereignty, national individuality or separateness, then it does not contribute to the unity and building up of the Church, but it rather invites self-sufficiency and living in isolation, and it becomes, paradoxically, a sin against the Holy Spirit. [...] The temptation is the same in our very close and brotherly Ukraine, where the passion filled chauvinist-Russophobes, led by corrupt politicians with the assistance of Uniates and, unfortunately, with the uncanonical cooperation of the Ecumenical Patriarchate, deepened and spread the existing schism and seriously jeopardized the unity of Orthodoxy in general."

On 29 January 2019, during a visit for the 10th anniversary of the enthronement of Patriarch Kirill of Moscow, Patriarch Irinej declared, among other things, that what is happening in Ukraine was comparable to a "bomb" thrown at Orthodoxy. On the same day, in an interview, he declared the Ukrainian question, in the 21st century, "can divide the Orthodox world and have serious repercussions."

On 5 February 2019, Orthochristian informed that "there will be separate Sunday of Orthodoxy celebrations in Chicago this year on March 17, [...] with the Serbian Church and ROCOR celebrating together separately from the Greek Metropolis." On 14 March the same source reported that the priests of the SOC "have been instructed not to serve with Constantinople clergy throughout America and Canada."

On 28 February, the DECR of the ROC published a statement of the Serbian Orthodox Church, in which the SOC told his position concerning the Ukrainian question. However, some religious experts began to have doubts on the authenticity of the statement as there was no hyperlinks to the original statement. On 13 March, the SOC published the same statement on its website. The SOC also sent its statement to all the local Orthodox churches. The head of the Serbian Church's Information and Publishing Department published a communiqué on 13 March in which he gave his personal opinion that "it is recommended, but not required, that Serbian hierarchs and clergy abstain from serving with those who have communion with the schismatics. Such a heavy decision as breaking communion can only be made by the Council of Bishops, not the Holy Synod, in the Serbian Orthodox Church."

The council of bishops of the SOC, held from May 9 to 18, 2019, decided not to recognize the OCU. The council of bishops also stated: "The biggest problem of the Orthodox Church today is the Church schism in Ukraine and the unsuccessful attempts of the Patriarchate of Constantinople to solve the problem "on the knee," unilaterally, without dialogue with the canonical Church in Ukraine and with the Russian Orthodox Church, and in general without pan-Orthodox consultations."

Greek Orthodox Church of Antioch 
On 6 October, the synod of the Greek Patriarchate of Antioch announced its support for a pan-Orthodox synaxis on the question of Ukraine's autocephaly.

On 20 October, the Serbian and Antiochian patriarchs made a common declaration in which they "appeal to their brother, His All Holiness the Ecumenical Patriarch, to restore the fraternal dialogue with the Orthodox Church of Russia in order to, with the fraternal assistance and participation of all the other primates of the Local Orthodox Autocephalous Churches, resolve the conflict between the Patriarchates of Constantinople and Moscow and to restore back the bond of peace in the Orthodox Church".

The primate of the Greek Orthodox Church of Antioch answered to the 24 December 2018 letter of the Ecumenical Patriarch, which asked the primates of the local churches to recognize the autocephaly of the Orthodox Church of Ukraine, by asking the Ecumenical Patriarch to postpone the grant of autocephaly to the Orthodox Church of Ukraine.

On 17 January 2019, Patriarch John X of Antioch declared he "fully supported" Russia on the question of Ukraine.

On 29 January 2019, at a meeting with Patriarch Kirill of Moscow, Patriarch John X declared: "We urged, and continue to urge, the Ecumenical patriarch and other supreme clergy to resolve existing problems, including those currently faced by our fraternal Russian Orthodox Church, through dialogue, through negotiation, through ordinary conversation".

On 1 February 2019, in a homily for the 10th anniversary of the enthronement of Kirill of Moscow, John X of Antioch expressed his "deep, heartily pain and great sorrow towards what is happening in our Orthodox Church these days and Her affliction as a result of individuality, lack of dialogue, and absence of conciliarity, and of what happened recently in Ukraine". John X also appealed to all the primates of the Orthodox autocephalous churches and said it was time "to gather and meet in order to proclaim our commitment to the unity of our Holy Orthodox Church, and our belief that Her light coming from the Light of Christ remains bright and glorious."

On 18 April 2019, the primates of the Church of Cyprus, the Church of Alexandria, the Church of Antioch, and the Church of Jerusalem gathered. They released a communiqué in which they write that among other things they "looked into the problems that arose after granting autocephaly to the Orthodox Church in Ukraine". The primates of Alexandria, Antioch and Jerusalem supported the "initiative of mediation" of the primate of the Church of Cyprus.

On 2 March 2022, the Holy Synod of the Church of Antioch released a statement, according to which its bishops "reiterated the position of the Patriarchate of Antioch stressing the necessity to return to the principle of consensus and unanimity of all Orthodox Churches [...] to find solutions to controversial issues challenging the Orthodox world" and expressed "their sympathy to the shepherds of the Ukrainian Orthodox Church presided by His Beatitude Metropolitan Onufriy" about the 2022 Russian invasion of Ukraine, omitting both the Russian involvement and the Orthodox Church of Ukraine led by Epiphanius.

Georgian Orthodox Church 
On 30 September, the Georgian Orthodox Church published a statement on its website in which it encouraged the Patriarchates of Moscow and Constantinople to work together on the dispute over Ukraine.

Although Ukrainian parliament chairman Andriy Parubiy stated after an October 5 visit to Tbilisi that the Georgian Orthodox Church (GOC) was in support of Kiev, Georgian Patriarch Ilia II later denied this, and church spokesman Mikhail Botkoveli said: "We need more time to discuss the arguments of the Russian Orthodox Church, after which the Georgian Orthodox Church will announce its position". It is reported that there are sharp divisions within the Georgian Orthodox Church, which analysts see as "the most pro-Russian institution in an anti-Russian country". A major factor in the dispute within the GOC is the role of the Abkhazian Orthodox Church (AOC) which itself broke from the GOC, the Russian Orthodox Church has offered to mediate the dispute between the GOC and the AOC. Some clerics see this as a reason to maintain the goodwill of the Russian Orthodox Church and others viewed the Abkhazian church as already "under the control of Moscow"; some accused Moscow of hypocrisy, with one theologian arguing publicly that "The (Moscow) patriarchate is betraying the biblical principle of ‘do unto others as you would have them do unto you'".

After its synod of 27 December 2018, the GOC said it waited further developments and would declare its position in January 2019. According to a Metropolitan of the GOC, the GOC supports the Ukrainian autocephaly.

After the granting of autocephaly to the Orthodox Church of Ukraine (5 January 2019), officials of the GOC declared discussions concerning Ukrainian autocephaly would continue during subsequent meetings of the synod of the GOC. Some bishops of the GOC congratulated the Orthodox Church of Ukraine for its autocephaly.

On 29 January 2019, the GOC released a statement in which it stated that the main goal is now "to care for keeping the unity of Orthodox Church". Moreover, the statement reads: "The issuance of a tomos to the Ukrainian church drew various opinions in the entire Orthodox world, both in the secular world and in the clergy. We now have two parties that are defending their positions. None of the parties refrains from insults and blackmail".

It is the Ecumenical Patriarchate which initiated the visit. On 30 January, after the meeting, Emmanuel of France declared: "We discussed the issue of the Ukrainian church's autocephaly and the tomos. Our purpose was to inform [each other] about some details, we didn't want for force any positions. It was just an information meeting. We know that the catholicos-patriarch has a lot of wisdom and can make the right decision".

A Georgian theologian wrote a letter to Metropolitan Hilarion, blaming the latter for using the authority of the Catholicos-Patriarch of Georgia to silence those who supported the recognition of the OCU by the GOC. Extract of the letter were published by Ukrinform on 5 February 2019.

Romanian Orthodox Church 

The Romanian Orthodox Church on 26 October called for Constantinople to co-operate with Moscow in resolving the issue, and stated that "unity is preserved through co-responsibility and cooperation between the Local Orthodox Churches, by cultivating dialogue and synodality at the pan-Orthodox level, this being a permanent necessity in the life of the Church."

On 23 November 2018, the Ecumenical Patriarch arrived in Romania to lead the consecration of the Romanian People's Salvation Cathedral which was planned on Sunday 25 November; the Ecumenical Patriarch was officially welcomed by Patriarch Daniel of Romania. On Sunday 25 November, the Ecumenical Patriarch and Patriarch Daniel of Romania consecrated together the Romanian People's Salvation Cathedral. The Ecumenical Patriarch chaired the first mass of the Romanian People's Salvation Cathedral. Both the Ecumenical Patriarch Bartholomew and the Patriarch Daniel of Romania led the church service this day; it was the very first church service in the cathedral. The presence of Bartholomew and the absence of Patriarch Kirill of Moscow at the cathedral inauguration "appears to suggest that Romania is siding with Constantinople in the dispute."

To the questions: "Will Patriarch Kiril in Romania come to the sanctification of the painting?" and "How will the presence of His Holiness Bartholomew I affect the relationship between the ROC [Romanian Orthodox Church] and the Russian Patriarchate [Russian Orthodox Church]?", the Romanian Patriarchate spokesman Vasile Bănescu answered: "I am absolutely convinced that Patriarch Kiril will return to Romania on the occasion of the sanctification of the painting and will not withdraw because the ROC had the wisdom to plead for a dialogue to heal the wound of this separation between the Patriarchate of Constantinople and the Patriarchate of Moscow and All Russia. [...] We hope that this relationship, currently interrupted, will be resumed. The Romanian Patriarchate has a natural relationship with the Moscow Patriarchate and there are no tensions at the moment".

On 21 February 2019, the Holy Synod of the Romanian Orthodox Church discussed the Ukrainian question and declared in a communiqué:

The Romanian Orthodox Church also stated in the same communiqué: that once the schism in Ukraine will have been healed, once the Ecumenical Patriarchate and the Moscow Patriarchate will have settled down their dispute over Ukraine, once the Romanian Orthodox Church will have "written assurances from Ukrainian ecclesiastical and state authorities that the ethnic and linguistic identity of [the 127 Romanian Orthodox parishes in Ukraine currently administered by the UOC-MP] will be respected, and that these Romanian Orthodox will have the possibility to organise themselves within a Romanian Orthodox Vicariate and to be able to cultivate spiritual relations with the Romanian Patriarchate", and once the Ecumenical Patriarchate will have clarified "the problem of the non-canonical hierarchs and priests in the West, who belonged to the former ‘Kiev Patriarchate’", then "the Holy Synod will express its official position on the situation of Orthodoxy in Ukraine."

Patriarch Daniel wrote the preface of the Romanian edition of the book "The Everyday Years 'Quests" by Russian Patriarch Kirill.

Albanian Orthodox Church 
On 10 October, Archbishop Anastasios, head of the autocephalous Albanian Orthodox Church, (AOC) sent a letter to the Moscow Patriarch. Extracts of this letter have been published on 22 November on the official website of the Department of External Church Relations of the Russian Orthodox Church. In those extracts, the head of the Albanian Church declared that granting autocephaly to Ukraine was a "dangerous undertaking" and that "instead of the unity of Orthodox Christians in Ukraine, there has appeared a danger of schism in the unity of the universal Orthodoxy". He also said they should do everything to hold a pan-Orthodox Council.

The next day, the official website of the Albanian Orthodox Church published the full text of the letter of October 10, as well as the second letter, dated November 7, through the hosting service DocDroid, in English and in Greek. In his first letter, Archbishop Anastasios declared the 14 September decision of Moscow had "dangerously complicated the whole matter" concerning Ukraine - this passage had not been released among the extracts on the official website of the Department of External Church Relations of the Russian Orthodox Church. In his second letter, Archbishop Anastasios disagreed with the decisions of the Moscow Patriarchate to break communion with the Church of Constantinople, stating: "It is unthinkable that the Divine Eucharist [...] could be used as a weapon against another Church. [...] We proclaim it is impossible for us to agree to such decisions." He also added that recent developments have made the convocation of a Pan-Orthodox synaxis "extremely difficult" but that the Albanian Orthodox Church was willing to participate in it, if the Pan-Orthodox synaxis was convoked canonically. The second letter was not published by Moscow.

On 14 January 2019,the Holy Synod of the AOC sent a letter to Patriarch Bartholomew to ask the latter to hold a Pan-Orthodox council "as soon as possible" to prevent "the evident risk of a painful schism." The Holy Synod declared the ordinations performed by Filaret were "non-existent, void, deprived of the divine grace of the Holy Spirit. [...] It is recognized by all of Orthodoxy as a fundamental ecclesiological principle that the ordinations of schismatics and heretics, as "mysteries" performed outside of the Church, are invalid, so all the more so ordinations by someone who is deposed and excommunicated". The Ecumenical Patriarch answered with a letter containing arguments to prove the validity of the clergy of the OCU. On 21 March 2019, the Albanian Orthodox Church sent a new reply in which he gave counter arguments to the Ecumenical Patriarch's arguments.

Orthodox Church of the Czech Lands and Slovakia 
On 10 November, the head of the Orthodox Church of the Czech Lands and Slovakia (OCCLS), Archbishop Rastislav of Prešov, met with the head of the UOC-MP, Metropolitan Onufry. On this occasion, Archbishop Rastislav of Prešov declared his concern about the situation in Ukraine and condemned the Ecumenical Patriarchate's actions, stating that "it is impossible to create even a temporary good on the violation of the sacred canons of the Orthodox Church".

On 24 November, Archbishop of Prague of the OCCLS, Michael, met with Metropolitan Agafangel of Odessa of the UOC-MP. Said Archbishop of Prague declared to the UOC-MP members: "We have arrived to show our unity with you, as representatives of an autocephalous Church".

In the end of January 2019, the holy synod of the OCCLS asked for a pan-Orthodox meeting on the question of Ukraine to be held.

On 6 February 2019, commenting on the enthronement of Metropolitan Epiphanius, primate Rastislav of Prešov declared Epiphanius was an impostor and that the canonical head of the Orthodox church in Ukraine was Metropolitan Onuphry.

Bulgarian Orthodox Church 
The Bulgarian Orthodox Church (BOC) first said it could not comment. On 15 December, Metropolitan Daniel (Nikolov) of Vidin, in an interview published on the official website of the BOC, declared the Ukrainian unification council was uncanonical and that the project to create an autocephalous church in Ukraine was only political.

On 17 May 2019, Metropolitan Daniel (Nikolov) of Vidin sent a letter to all the Metropolitans of the Church of Greece telling them that the actions of the Ecumenical Patriarch "destroy, threaten and damage the Orthodox Church's unity and catholicity. In our opinion, the Orthodox Church is at a crossroads: show its catholic wisdom and protect unity, holiness, universality and apostolicity, or choose the path of Eastern papism, repeating the sad history of 1054." However, the Holy Synod of the BOC declared on 12 June 2019 after its meeting that the letter of Metropolitan Daniel "is his personal view. The Holy Synod is categorically differentiated. In the questions raised by Metropolitan Daniel, the Synod has no solution."

On 12 June, due to the pro-ROC actions of Metropolitan Daniel (Nikolov) - the unauthorized distribution of anti-Constantinople letters to representatives of local churches and a trip to Moscow without the blessing of the Patriarch and the Synod, the  Patriarch and the Synod having declared those actions harmed the Bulgarian Orthodox Church and the national security of Bulgaria -, both Bulgarian metropolites Nikolai of Plovdiv and Daniel (Nikolov) of Vidin announced they broke the Eucharistic communion between each others, refused to pray for each others, to recognize each others' existence and to serve each others. Allegedly, 75% of the BOC supports Nikolai of Plovdiv, while 25% supports Daniel of Vidin.

Church of Jerusalem 
On 18 April 2019, the primates of the Church of Cyprus, the Church of Alexandria, the Church of Antioch, and the Church of Jerusalem gathered. They released a communiqué in which they write that among other things they "looked into the problems that arose after granting autocephaly to the Orthodox Church in Ukraine". The primates of Alexandria, Antioch and Jerusalem supported the "initiative of mediation" of the primate of the Church of Cyprus.

On 16 May 2019, Patriarch of Jerusalem Theophilos III met with representatives of the Russian Imperial Orthodox Palestine Society. In his thank you speech, Theophilos III called the Church of Jerusalem "the Mother of all the Churches" and "the guarantor of the unity of the Orthodox Church". The Ecumenical Patriarchate claims to be the only be the guarantor of Orthodox unity.

Church of Greece 
On 28 August 2019, the Standing Holy Synod of the Church of Greece stated that the Ecumenical Patriarch had the right to grant autocephaly, and that the primate of the Church of Greece had the "privilege" to "to further deal with the question of recognition of the Church of Ukraine".

On 7 October 2019, "a day before the start of the proceedings of the Synod of the Hierarchy of the Church of Greece, [the Archbishop of Athene] informed in a letter the Body of Hierarchs that he would add another extraordinary meeting this coming Saturday regarding exclusively the Ukrainian issue." This meeting was scheduled for 12 October 2019.

On 12 October 2019, the Orthodox Church of Greece recognized the autocephaly of the Orthodox Church of Ukraine, stating that "the Ecumenical Patriarchate of Constantinople has the right to granting autocephalies" During the debate preceding the recognition, more than 35 Metropolitans of the Church of Greece declared they had been pressured by the ROC but did not yield to it. On 15 October the GoC released an official statement.

According to news media reports, it had been tentatively expected that the official recognition of the OCU would take place on 19 October "in Thessaloniki where Archbishop Ieronymos and Metropolitan Epiphanius w[ould] possibly concelebrate the Divine Liturgy." On 19 October, the Ecumenical Patriarch Bartholomew and Archbishop Ieronymos II of Athens jointly celebrated a liturgy in the Church of the Acheiropoietos in Thessaloniki, Greece, at which Metropolitan Epiphanius′ name was commemorated by the Patriarch. The fact was interpreted by Greek medias as a definitive acknowledgement (recognition) of Epiphanius by the Church of Greece. In his speech toward the end of the liturgy, Patriarch Bartholomew thanked Ieronymos II because, Bartholomew said, Ieronymos II "identified with the canonical decisions of the Ecumenical Patriarchate. He also wrote the name of Metropolitan Epiphanius of Kiev and All Ukraine on the pages of the Diptychs." A spokesman of the Moscow Patriarchate contested such interpretation pointing up the fact that Epiphanius' name was not said directly by the Archbishop.

On 21 October 2019, Archbishop Ieronymos II, the primate of the Church of Greece, sent a peaceful letter to Metropolitan Epiphanius, the primate of the OCU. The Archbishop′s letter meant that the Church of Greece had officially communicated to the OCU that the Church of Greece had recognized it.

Unrecognized or partially recognized Orthodox churches

Belarusian, Macedonian and Montenegrin Orthodox churches and the Croatian Orthodox Union 
The unrecognized Macedonian and Montenegrin Orthodox churches have stated that they cannot yet comment.

On 11 October, the Belarusian Autocephalous Orthodox Church announced that the abolition of the "Synodal Letter of the year 1686" would give rise to a disengagement from the ROC like the UOC.

The Macedonian Orthodox Church has asked to be canonically recognized by the Ecumenical Patriarch but was met with a harsh refusal, "Constantinople insisted on drawing a distinction between the situation with the Ukrainian Church and the Macedonian church [... :] Constantinople had never given up its own jurisdiction over Ukraine in favour of Moscow, whereas it did so with the Macedonian eparchies in favour of the Serbian Church in 1922, when a Macedonian state did not exist."

Metropolitan Miraš Dedeić of the Montenegrin Orthodox Church in November 2018 called on the Montenegrin government to solve the [Montenegrin] church problem as with the Orthodox Church of Ukraine.

In response to the news of the future granting of autocephaly to Ukraine, the Croatian Orthodox Union in November 2018 criticized the Croatian government for not respecting the freedom of religion of the Croatian Orthodox Church and for not supporting the autocephaly of a Croatian Orthodox Church.

Abkhazian and Turkish Orthodox Churches 
On October 16, 2018, the Autocephalous Turkish Orthodox Patriarchate filed a lawsuit against the Ecumenical Patriarchate of Constantinople and Bartholomaios I because, according to the Treaty of Lausanne of 1923, only services for Greek-based Greeks should be performed by the Patriarch of Constantinople and therefore no exarchs may be sent to Ukraine and their church may not be granted autocephaly.

On 22 October 2018, the unrecognized Abkhazian Orthodox Church declared in an official statement: "We raise a prayer voice, because the actions of the Patriarchate of Constantinople, which are aimed at taking the Orthodox Church all over the world, violate church canons. Such an initiative of Patriarch Bartholomew will lead to a catastrophe for the Slavic peoples and the entire Orthodox world."

Orthodox Church in America 
On 26 October, Metropolitan Tikhon, head of the Orthodox Church in America (OCA) issued an archpastoral letter in which he supported the idea of a pan-Orthodox synaxis on the question of Ukraine. On 28 January 2019, the Holy Synod of the OCA, its primate included, issued an Archpastoral Letter on Ukraine. In this letter, the OCA declared it had decided:

In a 16 May 2019 encyclical, the Holy Synod of Bishops of the OCA reaffirmed its position taken in its 28 January 2019 pastoral letter.

Churches under the jurisdiction of the Russian Orthodox Church

Belarusian Orthodox Church 
On 11 September 2018, the synod of the Belarusian Orthodox Church (the Exharcate of the Russian Orthodox Church in Belarus) issued a statement proclaiming their "unanimous support" for the position of Patriarch Kirill of Moscow, protesting the actions of the Ecumenical Patriarchate.

On 5 October, the Metropolitan Paul (Ponomaryov) of the Belarusian Orthodox Church "urge[d] the Patriarch Bartholomew [of Constantinople] and the synod of the Church of Constantinople to review their decisions and do everything possible to either disavow the previous decision or withdraw it, stopping this process, which [...] is taking absolutely distinct forms of church schism throughout Eastern Orthodoxy[.]"

After the schism the Belarusian Orthodox Church has not released an official statement about the break of communion with the Ecumenical Patriarchate. Since it is the exarchate of the Russian Orthodox Church, it obeys the decisions of the Holy Synod of the ROC.

Metropolis of Chișinău and All Moldova 
In April 2019, the Metropolis of Chișinău and All Moldova condemned the actions of the Ecumenical Patriarchate in Ukraine.

Russian Orthodox Church Outside Russia 
On 25 September 2018, the Russian Orthodox Church Outside Russia (an autonomous church of the Moscow Patriarchate) (ROCOR) "suspended concelebration with the bishops of the Constantinople Patriarchate and participation in the work of the Episcopal Assemblies with their membership".

On 10 October 2018, the Russian Orthodox Church Outside Russia has "express[ed] [its] profound indignation at the blatant violation of the Holy Canons by the Orthodox Church of Constantinople. The decision of its hierarchy to send its ‘exarchs’ into the canonical territory of the Ukrainian Orthodox Church, without the agreement and permission of His Holiness Patriarch Kirill of Moscow and All Russia and His Beatitude Metropolitan Onufry of Kiev and All Ukraine, is a gross and unprecedented incursion by one Local Church into a distant canonical territory[.]"

On 18 October 2018, the Russian Orthodox Church Outside Russia has expressed "complete support of the position taken by the Holy Synod of the Patriarchate of Moscow, following its meeting of 15th October 2018" and severed Eucharistic communion with the Ecumenical Patriarchate.

On 8 December 2018, the ROCOR released a communiqué in which it states that if fully supports Onufriy and considers the Ecumenical Patriarchate's actions in Ukraine as illegal.

Ukrainian Orthodox Church (Moscow Patriarchate) 
On 13 September, secretary for Inter-Orthodox Affairs of the Department for External Church Relations of the ROC, Archpriest Igor Yakimchuk, urged the UOC-MP believers to unite around Metropolitan Onufriy. The dioceses who pledged support to Onufriy were (in chronological order): Rivne, Odessa, Zaporizhia, Poltava, Sievierodonetsk, Kamianske, Kharkiv, Luhansk, Oleksandriya, Mukachevo, Zhytomyr, Kropyvnytsky, Chernihiv, Crimea, Izium, Nova Kakhovka, Mykolaiv, and Nizhyn. The three dioceses of Sumy, Konotop, and Romny, also declared their support for Onufriy.

On 24 October, the Department of External Church Relations of the Russian Orthodox Church published on its website an interview with the head of the Ukrainian Orthodox Church (Moscow Patriarchate), Metropolitan Onufry; this interview was previously published by the Information and Education Department of the Ukrainian Orthodox Church. In the interview, Onufry said that "[i]f the Tomos on the Patriarch of Constantinople's recognition of the schismatics is granted, then it will generate new schisms, larger and deeper. These schisms will affect not only our Ukraine – they will affect the whole world Orthodox Church."

On 13 November, the synod of the UOC-MP (an autonomous church of the Moscow Patriarchate) officially declared in a resolution that they considered the 11 October declaration of the Ecumenical Patriarchate "invalid" and canonically "null and void", and that the communion between the UOC-MP and the Ecumenical Patriarchate "is deemed impossible at present and thereby ceases". Two bishops of the UOC-MP did not sign the resolution, one of them being Metropolitan Simeon of Vinnytsia and Bar.

In an interview given on 14 November to the Vinnytsia Press Club, Metropolitan Simeon of Vinnytsia and Bar of the UOC-MP said he did not sign the UOC-MP resolution as he disagreed with some statements in the resolution and considered this resolution as "bad". He also said he would participate in the unification council. On 15 November, most of the clergy of Vinnytsia of the UOC-MP met in emergency, spontaneously and without the prior consent of its hierarchy. Most of the clergy of Vinnytsia publicly expressed its support to the 13 November resolution of the UOC-MP, and made an appeal to Metropolitan Simeon to ask him to hold a general meeting of the Vinnytsia eparchy. On 17 November, in a sermon, Metropolitan Simeon clarified that his refusal was his own decision, because, he stated, "not a single bishop represented the opinion of his eparchy or people at the Council, everyone spoke for themselves". On 20 November, an official monthly general meeting of the Vinnytsia eparchy chaired by Metropolitan Simeon was held; the Eparchial Council "categorically condemned the unauthorized assemblies held in the Vinnytsia eparchy" and "stated that the Resolution of the Bishops’ Council of the Ukrainian Orthodox Church, taken on November 13, 2018, is a document binding on all bishops, clergy and laity of the UOC and confirmed its readiness to comply with the Resolution by the entire Vinnytsia eparchy."

On 16 November 2018 Metropolitan Sophroniy (Dmitruk) of Cherkasy and Kaniv in his interview to BBC expressed his support for the creation of an autocephalous Church in Ukraine. He also said that he was going to participate in the unification council, and perhaps he would join the new autocephalous Church.

On 20 November 2018, chancellor of the UOC-MP, Metropolitan Anthony of Boryspil and Brovary, declared in an interview that "[s]anctions will be applied to the members of the Ukrainian Orthodox Church [of the Moscow Patriarchate] who participate in the 'Unification Council'".

On 7 December, the UOC-MP synod declared the unification council conveyed by the Ecumenical Pariarchate as unlawful.

On 17 December 2018, it was reported by Ukrinform (a Ukrainian State news outlet) that the Federal Security Service of Russia, along with members of the Moscow Patriarchate, had created mobile groups to prevent communities in Ukraine from switching from the UOC-MP to the OCU. Thoses groups are present in each diocoese of the UOC-MP and are composed of a lawyer and several sporty men.

On 3 April 2019, the synod of the UOC-MP issued a statement on the situation in the Ukrainian and world Orthodoxy. In said statemement, the UOC-MP "calls upon Patriarch Bartholomew of Constantinople to admit its [sic] mistake, rescind the tomos granted to the [...] "Orthodox Church of Ukraine," and begin correcting its [sic] mistake."

Diocese of Chersonesus 

The Diocese of Chersonesus is an archidiocese under the jurisdiction of the Moscow Patriarchate. The Archdiocese of Chersonesus, at that time, took charge of the Orthodox communities of the Moscow Patriarchate in France, Swiss, Portugal and Spain. On 22 November 2018, during its annual session, the Archdiocese of Chersonesus unanimously declared its support of the decision made by the ROC on 15 October 2018 to break communion with Constantinople. On the next day, this decision was announced through an official communiqué on the diocese's official website in which they stated that the action of the Ecumenical Patriarch in Ukraine was "anti-canonical".

Diocese of Berlin and Germany 

On December 5, the OBKD held its autumn plenary assembly in Bonn without the members of the two Russian Orthodox dioceses of Germany (the German diocese of the ROCOR and the ROC diocese of Berlin and Germany). The Secretary General of the OBKD,  of the ROC, did not attend at the meeting and had therefore to be temporarily replaced by the Serbian Orthodox Archpriest Radomir Kolundzic. The present bishops of the Greek,  and Serbian Orthodox dioceses of Germany regretted the absence of the Russian bishops and expressed the hope of "overcoming intra-Orthodox tensions," says their communiqué.

On 18 February 2019, the ROCOR published on its official websites a letter by Archbishop Mark of the German diocese of the Russian Orthodox Church Outside Russia; the letter was addressed to the Assembly of Orthodox Bishops in Germany. In this letter, Mark declared that he writes the letter to "clarify" the position of his diocese "on the current developments among the Orthodox." In his letter, Mark writes that "The unity of the Orthodox in Germany, which is currently represented through the OBKD (Assembly of Orthodox Bishops in Germany), is extremely valuable  [...] And yet, all that we have built so far now is threatened by the current developments in Ukraine(see the Statement of our Diocese Counsel from 25.09.2018.)." Mark thereafter announced the decision that they "have determined to withdraw the  representatives of our diocese from all committees for which the OBKD is responsible and in which their clergy preside as subjects of the Patriarchate of Constantinople. In particular, we will stop sending representatives to the Commission on Theology and Education, and we will suspend our participation in the meetings of the OBKD." The ROC published Mark's letter on its official websites.

Churches under the jurisdiction of the Ecumenical Patriarchate

Archdiocese of Russian Orthodox Churches in Western Europe 
The Archdiocese of Russian Orthodox Churches in Western Europe (AROCWE) was an exarchate of the Ecumenical Patriarchate, its primate at the time the archidiocese's dissolution was announced was Archbishop . On 18 October 2018, in reaction to the 15 October decision of the Russian Orthodox Church to sever communion with the Ecumenical Patriarchate, the AROCWE released a communiqué. In this communiqué, the AROCWE declared that the AROCWE, "Archdiocese-Exarchate under the jurisdiction of the Ecumenical Patriarchate", was "in full communion with the whole Orthodox Church. Indeed, the Ecumenical Patriarchate did not break communion with the Patriarchate of Moscow and continues to commemorate it according to the order of the diptychs. All the Orthodox faithful can therefore participate fully in the liturgical and sacramental life of our parishes." The communiqué concluded by asking all the priests, deacons, monks, nuns and faithful of the AROCWE to pray for the unity of the Church.

On 21 November, the rector of the Russian Church of the Transfiguration in Stockholm expelled 16 faithfuls from the parish because after the 15 October they had publicly "ceased to recognize the legitimacy and spiritual authority of [...] Ecumenical Patriarch Bartholomew and [...] Archbishop John of Chariopoulis".

Defection of the Russian Orthodox Church of the Nativity of Christ 
At the end of the celebration, Blatinsky told the faithful present that from that Sunday onward the parish had been placed under the jurisdiction of Metropolitan Hilarion of the Russian Orthodox Church Outside Russia (ROCOR) of the Patriarchate of Moscow. He justified this change of jurisdiction by saying that the Ecumenical Patriarchate had fallen into "schism" as a result of its intervention in Ukraine. According to the AROCWE's information, this decision, which was taken unilaterally by George Blatinsky, was thereafter been presented as being the result of a unanimous vote of a "general assembly of the parish", which was contrary to ecclesiastical norms and the civil statutes of the parish since no assembly had been convened for that day in accordance with the rules. Metropolitan Hilarion of the ROCOR assured archpriest George Blatinsky by telephone that he did not need any letter of canonical release from the AROCWE in order to be received into the ROCOR's jurisdiction since, according to Met. Hilarion, "all those who depend on Constantinople are schismatics".

Archbishop John imposed the sanctions of a ban a divinis (suspension of priestly functions), which took effect on 1 November 2018, upon Archpriest George Blatinsky and Priest Oleg Turcan, the second priest of the parish; on 1 November, a commmuniqué announcing their suspension was published on the AROCWE's official websites. Archbishop John also sent a letter of protestation to Metropolitan Hilarion of the ROCOR, in New York, on 5 November 2018. On 22 November, the AROCWE released a commmuniqué explaining the situation; in said communiqué, the AROCWE also published the letter Archbishop John had sent to Metropolitan Hilarion of the ROCOR, in French, Russian and English, and said the AROCWE had not yet received an answer from Metropolitan Hilarion of the ROCOR.

Defection of the Russian Orthodox church of Sanremo 
On 23 January 2019, the Greek Metropolitan Gennadios of Italy suspended a divinis father Denis Baykov, rector of the Orthodox Church of Christ the Saviour, St. Catherine the Martyr, and St. Seraphim of Sarov, in Sanremo, Italy. This priest and this church were part of the AROCWE. The reason for the suspension were unspecified "anticanonical actions".

On 24 January 2019, the same Orthodox Church of Christ the Savior, the Great Martyr Catherine, and St. Seraphim of Sarov left the Ecumenical Patriarchate to join the ROCOR, along with the same father Denis Baikov as rector of said church.

On 4 February, the parishioners of the church voted unanimously to be transferred to the ROCOR. In an open letter, the rector of the church, Denis Baikov, called the AROCWE to join the ROCOR.

Dissolution of the archdiocese 

The Ecumenical Patriarchate decided on 27 November to dissolve the AROCWE; however, after a vote on 23 February 2019 the General Assembly of the AROCWE refused the dissolution with 206 voters voting against the dissolution and 15 voting in favor of the dissolution. A new assembly may possibly be held in June to choose a jurisdiction.

American Carpatho-Russian Orthodox Diocese 
2 priests of the American Carpatho-Russian Orthodox Diocese left the Ecumenical Patriarchate to join the Russian Orthodox Church Outside of Russia in response to the Ecumenical Patriarchate's decision concerning Ukraine.

Greek Orthodox Metropolis of Germany 
On October 16, the head of the  published a statement on the Metropolis' website saying: "With disappointment and grief I have noted yesterday's decision of the Holy Synod of the Moscow Patriarchate to sever the eucharistic communion with the Ecumenical Patriarchate, whose metropolitan in Germany I am. [...] As was the case then, this time too applies: particularly affected are the parishes in the so-called diaspora, where there is a coexistence between the two patriarchates, in other words also in Germany. [...] As far as Ukraine is concerned, it is the common concern of all Orthodox Christians how to succeed in solving ecclesiastical cleavages ecclesiastically, not politically; it has to be non-violent and effective. This is the determined and irrevocable intention of the Ecumenical Patriarchate of Constantinople, which, as a mother church, has the right to do so and, I believe, is obliged to have the daughter Ukraine grown up into self-employment. That the older daughter Moscow does not recognize it is regrettable."

Metropolis of Belgium 
Our ecclesiastic history has also been tested in the past, but we overcame the difficulties with the help of our Lord. Our Ecumenical Patriarchate, due to the rights provided by our tradition and the history of our Church, had taken the same initiative for so many other Orthodox sister Churches. Why not do the same with the Church of Ukraine?…"

Mount Athos 
It was planned that Epiphanius would be enthroned on 3 February 2019, which is also the date of his 40th birthday.  The monasteries of Mount Athos refused to send a delegation for the enthronement ceremony "not because the Fathers do not recognize its legitimacy or canonicity, but because they have chosen to stick with what has become official practice and accept invitations only to the enthronement of their ecclesiastical head, the Ecumenical Patriarch." Two abbots of Mount Athos were planned to come at the enthronement but were to be part of the delegation of the Ecumenical Patriarchate. On 1 February, once in Kyiv, Archimandrite Ephrem, one of the two Athonite abbots, was hospitalized for a heart attack. On 2 February, Archimandrite Ephrem was visited by Metropolitan Epiphanius.

As planned, Epiphanius was enthroned on 3 February 2019, in Saint Sophia Cathedral, Kyiv. Archimandrite Ephrem, who had been hospitalized on 1 February 2019, was not present at the ceremony of enthronement, but a hieromonk of Ephrem's monastery was present during the ceremony of enthronement. A monk from a skete of the Koutloumousiou Monastery was also present during the ceremony of enthronement.

On 8 February 2019, a delegation of the OCU visited the Mount Athos and celebrated divine liturgy there. The visit was, the OCU reports, "at the invitation of the Ecumenical Patriarchate". Against claim of "Russian propaganda" that the Russian St. Panteleimon Monastery had closed its doors to the OCU delegation, the OCU declared they had entered into the St. Panteleimon Monastery and that "Nobody closed any gate neither before us, nor for us".

On 12 February 2019, the community of the Mount Athos released a communiqué on which it declared: "We remain on the side of the Ecumenical Patriarchate and we will not tolerate its humiliation [...] Besides, we are not a Church, and we are not called upon to make a decision on recognition. [...] What is important is to maintain the unity of the Holy Monasteries and to send in every direction a clear message that no one will be allowed ‘to instrumentalize’ Mount Athos. Because Mount Athos concerns everyone".

On 28 February, the community of Mount Athos discussed the Ukrainian question. The monasteries of the Great Lavra, Iveron, Koutloumousiou, and Esphigmenou published a joint communiqué. In said communiqué, among other things, the monsteries "denounced the Russian interference and the violation of the self-governance status of the St Panteleimon Monastery". The communiqué was published in exclusivity by the ROMFEA news agency.

See also 
 Granting of autocephaly to the Orthodox Church of Ukraine
 Eastern Orthodox Church organization

References

Notes

References 

2018 Moscow–Constantinople schism
2018 in international relations
Reactions to 2010s events
Foreign relations of Russia
Foreign relations of Turkey